Raised by Wolves may refer to:

Books
 Raised by Wolves (book series), a young adult fantasy novel series by Jennifer Lynn Barnes

Podcasts
 Were You Raised By Wolves?, a weekly podcast about etiquette and manners

Songs
 "Raised by Wolves" (song), a song by Falling in Reverse
 Raised by Wolves (EP), a 2005 EP by Voxtrot
 "Raised by Wolves", a song by U2 on their 2014 album Songs of Innocence

Television
 Raised by Wolves (British TV series), a 2013 British television series written by Caitlin Moran
 Raised by Wolves (American TV series), a 2020 American scifi drama television series
 "Raised by Wolves" (episode), the first episode of the first season of Raised by Wolves

See also
 Feral child, a human child who has grown up isolated from human contact, sometimes with wolves
 Romulus and Remus, the origin myth of the city of Rome depicting twin brothers raised by wolves
 The Jungle Book, a collection of stories about a boy raised by wolves in the Indian jungle